Michael Kennedy (born May 16, 1954) is a Canadian film and television director, writer, actor and cinematographer raised in Kensington, Prince Edward Island, Canada.

Career
Kennedy has directed 20 feature-length films/TV movies and over 230 prime-time drama and comedy television episodes including the first season of the sitcom Little Mosque on the Prairie that used humour to attack racism against Muslims in the post-911 world. 

He also directed the first episodes filmed and/or aired of Delmer and Marta, My Life and a Movie, North/South, The Good Germany, Mental Block, Listen Missy, Screech Owls, P.R., Taking the Falls, and Jets.  He was also one of the directors of the acclaimed comedy series The Kids in the Hall, and directed 14 episodes of Made in Canada.

Kennedy has directed feature films in many countries: Jets was filmed in Germany and the US, Broken Lullaby in Budapest, One Man Out in Mexico, Caribe in Belize, Calculated Risk in Germany, and many others in Canada.  He also wrote the screenplays for three of the feature films he directed.

Kennedy lives with his wife, Carrie, and their three children in a suburb of Toronto, Canada.

Credits

Director

Write Place Write Time (2023)
Six Degrees of Santa (2022)
Lease On Love (2022)
Zarqa, Director Mentor only (2022)
My Favourite Christmas Melody (2021)
Tale of Two Hearts, Good Witch (2018)
#Roxy (2018)
Good Witch (2 episodes, 2017)
Heaven Must Be Boring! (pilot, 2014)
Delmer and Marta (pilot and entire first season, 2014–15)
Odd Squad (2 episodes, 2014)
Annedroids (5 episodes, 2014)
Greenpeace Greenwash Campaign (3 web shorts, 2013)
Walter! (52 short films, 2011 and 2013)
What's Up Warthogs! (14 episodes, 2011–2012) 
That's So Weird! (7 episodes, 2011–2012)
Really Me (2 episodes, 2012)
She's the Mayor (2 episodes, 2011)
Little Mosque on the Prairie (37 episodes, 2007–2011)
Pure Pwnage (2 episodes, 2010)
The Good Company (1 episode, 2010)
Lost and Found (2009)
The Smart Woman Survival Guide (3 episodes, 2007)
This Space for Rent (2 episodes, 2007)
North/South (5 episodes, 2006)
G-Spot (6 episodes, 2006)
Metropia (10 episodes, 2005–2006)
Mental Block (9 episodes, 2003–2004)
Made in Canada (13 episodes, 1999–2003)
Emily of New Moon (6 episodes, 1998–2002)
Blackfly (7 episodes, 2001–2002)
Rideau Hall (2 episodes, 2002)
Murder Among Friends (2001) (TV)
Screech Owls (2 episodes, 2001)
P.R. (7 episodes, 2000–2001)
Wind at My Back (2 episodes, 2000)
The City (1 episode, 2000)
Little Men (1 episode, 1999)
The Hoop Life (1999) TV series (unknown episodes)
So Weird (2 episodes, 1999)
JETS - Leben am Limit (1999) (TV)
Kalkuliertes Risiko (1997) (TV)
Joe's Wedding (1996)
Robin of Locksley (1996) (TV)
Hostile Force (1996) (TV)
Hard Evidence (1995)
The Possession of Michael D. (1995) (TV)
Taking the Falls (2 episodes, 1995)
Broken Lullaby (1994) (TV)
Red Scorpion 2 (1994)
Talons of the Eagle (1992)
The Swordsman (1992)
The Kids in the Hall (9 episodes, 1991–1992)
One Man Out (1989)
Caribe (1987)
Jim and Muggins Tour Toronto

Writer
JETS - Leben am Limit (1 episode, 1999)
The Swordsman (1992)
One Man Out (1989)
Degrassi Junior High (1 episode, 1988)
Caribe (1987) (uncredited)

Actor
These Foolish Things (1977) as Wilson
Trailer Park Boys - Reggie (2017–2018)

Cinematographer
These Foolish Things (1977)

External links

Directors Guild of Canada
New York Times

Canadian television directors
Canadian film directors
Toronto Metropolitan University alumni
Living people
1954 births
People from Summerside, Prince Edward Island
Canadian male film actors
Male actors from Prince Edward Island
Canadian Comedy Award winners